Allan Granger (29 July 1894 – 27 December 1957) was an Australian rules footballer who played for the Richmond Football Club in the Victorian Football League (VFL).

Notes

External links 
		

1894 births
1957 deaths
Australian rules footballers from Victoria (Australia)
Richmond Football Club players